John Bradford (1510–1555) was an English reformer and martyr.

John Bradford may also refer to:

Politicians
John Bradford (Australian politician) (born 1946), Australian former politician
John Bradford (MP) (fl. 1377–1391), MP for Leominster
John C. Bradford (born 1940), American politician in the Massachusetts House of Representatives
John Bradford (Kansas politician) (born 1951), member of the Kansas House of Representatives
 John R. Bradford III (born 1974), member of the North Carolina General Assembly

Sportsmen
Jack Bradford (footballer) (1895–1969), English footballer
Jock Bradford (1884–?), Scottish footballer (Morton, St Mirren)
John Bradford (footballer) (born 1979), Scottish footballer (Ayr United)
John Bradford (soccer) (born 1980), American soccer coach

Others
John Bradford (dissenting minister) (1750–1805), English non-conformist minister
John Bradford (poet) (1706–1785), Welsh poet
John Bradford (printer) (1749–1840), early American settler
Sir John Bradford, 1st Baronet (1863–1935), British physician
Jack Bradford (born 1959), Australian actor and director
John Spencer Purvis Bradford (1818–1975), British archaeologist

See also
John Bradford Fisher (born 1953), American plastic surgeon, pioneer in fat removal